Zion Stone Church, also known as Cornerstone Calvary Fellowship Inc., Augustaville, is a historic Lutheran and Reformed church on Tulpehocken Road in the hamlet of Augustaville, Rockefeller Township, Northumberland County, Pennsylvania.  It was built between 1814 and 1816, and is a two-story, reddish-brown stone building with an addition added in 2016 (not in picture).  It is an example of early-19th century Germanic style architecture.  It was originally a one-story building; the second floor was added in 1861. Major repairs occurred in 1883, 1930, and 1936.  Adjacent to the church is a cemetery with burials dating to 1793.

It was added to the National Register of Historic Places in 1984.

References

United Church of Christ churches in Pennsylvania
Churches on the National Register of Historic Places in Pennsylvania
Churches completed in 1816
Churches in Northumberland County, Pennsylvania
Stone churches in the United States
1816 establishments in Pennsylvania
National Register of Historic Places in Northumberland County, Pennsylvania